"Love Is the Right Place" is a song written by Marcus Hummon and Tommy Sims, and recorded by American country music singer Bryan White.  It was released in July 1997 as the first single from his album The Right Place.  The song peaked at number 4 on the U.S. country chart and at number 3 on the Canadian country chart. It also peaked at number 1 on the Bubbling Under Hot 100 chart.

Music video
The music video was directed by Jeffrey C. Phillips and premiered in mid-1997.

Chart performance
"Love Is the Right Place" debuted at number 65 on the U.S. Billboard Hot Country Singles & Tracks for the chart week of August 2, 1997.

Year-end charts

References

Bryan White songs
1997 singles
Songs written by Marcus Hummon
Songs written by Tommy Sims
Song recordings produced by Kyle Lehning
Song recordings produced by Billy Joe Walker Jr.
Asylum Records singles
1997 songs